A friand is a small almond cake, popular in Australia and New Zealand, closely related to the French financier.

The principal ingredients are almond flour, egg whites, butter, and powdered sugar. A friand typically has additional flavorings such as coconut, chocolate, fruit, and nuts. It is baked in small moulds, typically oval or barquette in shape. French financiers do not have additional flavorings.

In French, a friand, which literally means 'a tasty thing', generally refers to sausage, cheese, herbs or other stuffing baked in puff pastry. The word is not generally used to refer to an almond cake. See the wiktionary entry for friand.

References

Cakes
French pastries
Australian desserts
New Zealand desserts
Almond desserts